This is a list of monarchs of Tonga since 1845, after the Constitution of Tonga established the role of the monarch. The first monarch of Tonga was George Tupou I.

2008 cession of powers 
Three days before his coronation on 1 August 2008, then-King George Tupou V announced that he would relinquish most of his powers and be guided by the Prime Minister of Tonga's recommendations on most matters.

Budget allocation to monarchy 
Annual budget allocation to monarchy is T$ 4,894,900 ( US$2,116,799).

Lists of earlier monarchs of Tonga 
Tuʻi Tonga, rulers of Tonga from  950 to  1470.
Tuʻi Haʻatakalaua, rulers of Tonga from  1470 to  1800.
Tuʻi Kanokupolu, rulers of Tonga from  1800 to the present day. George Tupou I, the first king of Tonga, was the 19th Tuʻi Kanokupolu.

List of monarchs of Tonga (1845–present)

Timeline

Royal standards

Family tree

See also 
Tonga
Politics of Tonga
Prime Minister of Tonga
Crown of Tonga
Crown Prince of Tonga
List of royal consorts of Tonga
Succession to the Tongan throne
Lists of office-holders

References

External links 

World Statesmen – Tonga

 
Tonga
Monarchs
Monarchy